The 2019–20 Delaware Fightin' Blue Hens women's basketball team represented the University of Delaware during the 2019–20 NCAA Division I women's basketball season. The Fightin' Blue Hens, led by third year head coach Natasha Adair, played their home games at the Bob Carpenter Center and were members of the Colonial Athletic Association (CAA). They finished the regular season 12-17, 8-10 in CAA play to finish in sixth place. Delaware received a bye in the first round of the CAA tournament, however, the tournament was cancelled due to the coronavirus pandemic before they could play their first game, scheduled against William & Mary.

Roster

References

Delaware
 
Delaware Fightin' Blue Hens women's basketball seasons
Delaware Fightin' Blue Hens women's basketball
Delaware Fightin' Blue Hens women's basketball